Bišečki Vrh is a settlement in the Municipality of Trnovska Vas in northeastern Slovenia. It lies in the hills west of Trnovska Vas. The area is part of the traditional region of Styria. It is now included in the Drava Statistical Region.

A small chapel-shrine in the settlement was built in the early 20th century.

References

External links
Bišečki Vrh at Geopedia

Populated places in the Municipality of Trnovska vas